Isaac Caulker (born 25 Jan 1994) is a Sierra Leonean professional footballer who plays as a goalkeeper for Sierra Leone National Premier League's side Kallon FC, and Sierra Leone national team.

References 

1994 births
Sportspeople from Freetown
Living people
Sierra Leonean footballers
Sierra Leone international footballers
F.C. Kallon players
2021 Africa Cup of Nations players